Punky Brüster – Cooked on Phonics is the debut studio album by Canadian musician Devin Townsend, originally released as Cooked on Phonics under the fictional band name Punky Brüster. It was released on Townsend's label, HevyDevy Records, on March 19, 1996. It is a comedic metal/punk rock concept album written by Townsend. Cooked on Phonics tells the story of a fictitious death metal band "from South Central Poland" called Cryptic Coroner that sells out their metal look and sound to become a commercial punk rock band called Punky Brüster (the band's name being a pun on the 1980s U.S. television series Punky Brewster). At the end of the track "Larry's O," Townsend says the album took "A week-and-a-half to write, six days to record, 12 hours to mix."

Track listing

Personnel
Each member of the project is credited under two aliases, the first as a Punky Brüster member, and the second as a Cryptic Coroner member.

Devin Townsend: 
Dr. Skinny – main vocals, guitar
Lord Stenchlor 
John Randahl Harder
Squid Vicious – bass, vocals
Jokor, King of the Orcs
Adrian White: 
Dances with Chickens – drums
Underwator

Additional vocalists and musicians
Chris Valagao (E. Val Mescal) – vocals on Oats Peas Beans & Barley
Jed Simon (Ace Longback) – background vocals
Byron Stroud (Stoolie B. Flames) – vocals, textures
Bob Wagner (Velvet Kevorkian)
Chief Dontsmoken
Pete of Shit
Surrey Wagner – drums
Diananator 
Matteo Caratozzolo - editing, vocals

References

External links
Punky Bruster at DevyWorld 

1996 debut albums
Devin Townsend albums
Concept albums
Albums produced by Devin Townsend